The Manmohan Memorial National One-Day Cup (MM Cup) is a one-day cricket tournament in Nepal. It is one of two main 50-over tournaments in Nepal, the other being the Prime Minister One Day Cup.

History 
Shanti Deep Nepal organised the first Manmohan Memorial National One-Day Cup in January 2019 as one of the premier 50-over domestic cricket tournaments in Nepal, alongside the Prime Minister One Day Cup. The same seven provincial sides and three departmental sides are involved in both tournaments. This event also includes host club MMCC Inaruwa and an invited foreign side. In 2019, the Malaysian national team is competing ahead of a series against Nepal.

Teams 
The following teams currently participate in the Manmohan Memorial National One-Day tournament.

The following teams have featured in the tournament as guests.

Tournament history

References

 
Limited overs cricket
Nepalese domestic cricket competitions